Gordon Greig Hunter (born 8 November 1954) is an English former professional footballer who played as a defender in the Football League for York City, in non-League football for Northwich Victoria and was on the books of Shrewsbury Town without making a league appearance.

References

1954 births
Living people
People from Wiltshire
English footballers
Association football defenders
Shrewsbury Town F.C. players
York City F.C. players
Northwich Victoria F.C. players
English Football League players